Dean Schamore is an American politician and businessman who served as a member of the Kentucky House of Representatives for the 10th district from 2015 to 2021

Early life
Schamore was born and raised in Hardinsburg, Kentucky. He served in the United States Navy during the first Gulf War.

Career 
In 1993, Schamore founded Digital Connections Plus (DC+) as Dean's Computers Plus. As Dean's Computers Plus, the company's focus was on desktop support and networking. Dean's Computer's largest customer was in manufacturing.

Kentucky House of Representatives
In 2014, Schamore was elected to the Kentucky House of Representatives, defeating Republican nominee Alan Claypool and succeeding Dwight Butler.

On November 4, 2014, Schamore defeated Claypool in the general election with 8,099 votes (53.6%) to Claypool's 7,002 (46.4%).
, but w
Schamore was easily reelected in 2016, defeating Republican T. W. Shortt. Schamore went on to win one additional two-year term but was beaten by Republican Josh Calloway in the 2020 race.

Electoral history

References

Living people
Democratic Party members of the Kentucky House of Representatives
United States Navy sailors
21st-century American politicians
People from Hardinsburg, Kentucky
1968 births
United States Navy personnel of the Gulf War